The AeroConversions Aerovee Engine is a kit-built engine for homebuilt aircraft based on the Volkswagen air-cooled engine.

Design and development

The AeroVee engine is manufactured and marketed by AeroConversions, a part of Sonex Aircraft. In 2014, a turbocharger was developed as a $4,200 modification to existing AeroVee engines. The new turbocharged engine is rated at 100 hp.

Specifications (AeroVee 2.1)

References

2000s aircraft piston engines